Fingallian or the Fingal dialect is an extinct Anglic language formerly spoken in Fingal, Ireland. It is thought to have been an offshoot of Middle English, which was brought to Ireland during the Norman invasion, and was extinct by the mid-19th century. Although little is known of Fingallian, it is thought to have been similar to the Forth and Bargy dialect of County Wexford.

The surviving literature of Fingallian consists of two satirical or humorous poems, the short "Fingallian Dance" and the much longer Purgatorium Hibernicum. Both poems are anonymous and are thought to be humorous parodies of Fingallian by non-native speakers, so their value from a linguistic point of view may be limited.

History

Fingallian was spoken in the region of Fingal, traditionally the part of County Dublin north of the River Tolka. It was spoken in the area near the northern border. The name "Fingal" is from the Irish Fine Gall, or "territory of foreigners", probably a reference to a Norse settlement in the area. Linguist Alf Sommerfelt proposed the idea of a Norse influence on the Fingallian dialect, though later scholars have found no evidence of such a connection.

Like the Yola dialect of Forth and Bargy in County Wexford, Fingallian is thought to have derived from Middle English, which was introduced by "Old English" settlers after the Norman invasion of Ireland in 1169. Middle English was well established in southeastern Ireland until the 14th century, when the area was re-Gaelicized and English was displaced. As such, the Yola and Fingal dialects would have been the only attested relicts of this original English variety in Ireland.

The Fingallian Dance
The poem most likely to have been composed by a native speaker of Fingallian is The Fingallian Dance, a brief, three-stanza poem written between about 1650 and 1660. It is a mildly indecent poem about a man going to see dancers at a bullring (bull fighting was practised in 17th century Ireland). Although the poem is likely to have been standardised when written down, it gives a flavour of Fingallian, particularly forms like fat for "what" or fen for "when". Other words that need explanation are ame for "them", plack-keet for "placket" (a slit at the top of a petticoat, here used to mean a vulva), and abateing for "abutting, bordering on".

The Fingallian Dance c.1650

 [By my soul, I did spy]
 [docile, tractable],
 [to hell with them!]
 [chance, here meaning "account"]
 [thy]  ["Keep quiet, for goodness' sake!"]

Purgatorium Hibernicum
The Purgatorium Hibernicum is a humorous and bawdy burlesque or travesty on the Roman poet Virgil's Aeneid. It exists in three versions: the original manuscript (Purgatoriam Hibernicum), another manuscript entitled The Fingallian Travesty: the Sixt Book of Virgill's Aenoeids a la mode de Fingaule (1670–5), and a printed version called The Irish Hudibras or The Fingallian Burlesque (1689).

Virgil's prince Aeneas and his noble lover Dido are transformed into a bumbling young Fingallian called 'Prince' Nees and a coarse ex-nun Dydy. The names of all the characters are converted into mock 'Irish' forms and the places mentioned in Virgil's text become places in Fingal. Part of the humour for the Anglo-Irish readers of the poem is that Nees and Dydy converse with each other in broad Fingallian. Although the intention is supposedly to mock their speech, it is rendered with such vitality and wit that the effect is actually to give the reader an appreciation of its richness. 

The short extract below provides a good example of Fingallian. In it Nees encounters Dydy again and seeing her look pale and unwell realises that he may have been responsible for giving her the 'flame' or venereal disease. A few features need explanation: 'V' is used instead of 'W' in Fingallian; 'suggam' is a kind of straw rope'; Ful dea ro is derived from Irish fuil Dé, a rogha 'God's blood, my sweetheart':

'Sure, Sure!' sayes Nees, 'dis me old vench is!'
But when he drew more neare her quarters,
And know her by her suggam garters,
'Ful dea, ro, dou unlucky jade,
I'll chance upon dee! Art thou dead?
Fat devill vas be in dee, vench?
Vas he soe hot is cou'd no quench
De  flame?' Indeed, oh no! but Nees chief 
Occasion is of all dis mischeif'.

Nees continues with an attempt to sweet talk Dydys and asks her for a 'pogue', but his fears are justified and Dydy is having none of it. She tells him that if he think he can have another 'bout' with her, he can think again – after he has play'd the vagge (been a wag) with her and given her the bagge (rejected her) she will vatch de vales ('watch the walls', be on guard) and foil his plan:

'I, Nees', sayes she in mighty snuffe,
'and be! is tink is varm enough,
If dou cam shance but to find out
Dee old consort to have a bout –
and den, fen dou has play'd de vagge,
to give me, as before, de bagge!
Butt I will vatch de vales, Nees,
And putt foile on dee by dis chees,'

Then Dydy goes on her way in high dudgeon.

Letters from Ireland 
In John Dunton's Letters from Ireland (1698) he writes that in Fingal "they have a sort of jargon speech peculiar to themselves, and understand not one word of Irish, and are as little understood by the English". Dunton gives a sample of the language; a lamentation that a mother made over the grave of her son, who was a keen fisher and hunter. "little trust"):

This is roughly translated as:
Robin my love
Robin my dear
Thou wast good for land, strand and mountain
Good with a tool and [at] roast[ing] a whiting
Ready the tackle
Gather the bannocks
Drink a groat at Nanny Halfpenny's [alehouse]

Modern Fingal English

Although Fingallian is no longer spoken, a large number of dialect words unique to Fingal have survived, especially in traditional Fingal towns and villages such as Swords (now a large suburb of Dublin), Skerries, Rush, Lusk, Donabate, Garristown, Oldtown, Balrothery, Portrane and Naul. Major sources for these include glossaries in an article in the folklore Journal Béaloideas by J. J. Hogan and Patrick O'Neill and a book on Fingal lore entitled Fair Fingall by Patrick Archer.

Examples from Archer's Glossary include:

Cinnit (pronounced with hard 'C') – a dodger, trickster
Cloustered – covered up in clothes  
Dalk – a thorn, Ir. dealg
Dawney – delicate, weak
Glauming – groping
Lawneyday – an exclamation of surprise or regret, Ir. Láine Dé
Mullacking – working or walking in mud
Possing – sopping wet
Rossie – robust, blustering female
Scut – a short, mean person, a wren

Examples from Hogan and O'Neill's Glossary include:

Barney – a quarrel, a row
Bunched – ruined, finished
Buthoon – a bad blunder, Ir. Botún 
Clift – an idiot, especially a normally sensible person who has done something stupid
Cobby – cunning, worldly wise
Dugging – prodding or punching a person, fighting
Foopah – a blunder, Fr. faux pas
Gollockers – eyes (contempuously)
Go-boy – a sly fellow who goes about doing harm in secret
Launa-wallya – something to think about 'a bellyful', Ir. Lán a' mhála (meaning 'bagful')
Malavogue – to beat or maul
Moggy – a fat lazy person
Randyvoo – a house where people meet for a chat or mischief, Fr. rendez-vous
Raucie – a girl given to gadding about
Simmy-saumy – a foolish-looking person
Squib – a word used to address a stranger, esp. a boy e.g. 'hey, squib'
Tamboo – a shebeen, a miserable looking house
Whack – nothing, nobody, Ir. faic

See also
History of the English language
Hiberno-English

Notes

References

External links
Some words and expressions from Skerries, north Co. Dublin
Marks, Bernadette, 'Lawneyday', – article about Fingal words at swordsheritage.com

Languages attested from the 17th century
Languages extinct in the 19th century
Anglic languages
Extinct Germanic languages
History of Fingal
Languages of the Republic of Ireland
Medieval languages
Middle English